Daryl Theodore Sanders (born April 24, 1941) is a former professional American football player who played offensive tackle for four seasons for the Detroit Lions.

References

1941 births
Living people
Players of American football from Canton, Ohio
American football offensive tackles
Ohio State Buckeyes football players
Detroit Lions players